Tillie was a populated place in Adams County, Pennsylvania, United States, east of Orrtanna and south of McKnightstown that was the site of the McKnightstown railroad station on the Hanover Junction, Hanover and Gettysburg Railroad east of Orr Station and west of Seven Stars station after the railroad line was extended west from Gettysburg, Pennsylvania, in 1884 and west of Marsh Creek in 1885.

References

Geography of Adams County, Pennsylvania
Former populated places in Pennsylvania